MIMA may refer to:

 Member of the Institute of Mathematics and its Applications
 MiMA (building), an apartment building whose name means Middle of Manhattan, New York City, United States 
 Middlesbrough Institute of Modern Art, art gallery in Middlesbrough, England
 Modern Improvisational Music Association, a public charity in New Jersey, United States
 Multicultural and Indigenous Media Awards, former name of NSW Premier's Multicultural Communication Awards, Australia
 Millennium Iconoclast Museum of Art, museum in Brussels

See also
 Mima (disambiguation)